Facundo Pieres  (born May 19, 1986) Buenos Aires, Buenos Aires Province is a professional Argentine polo player with a 10 goal handicap. As of October 2022, he is ranked number one in the world.

Biography 
Facundo was born into a family of polo players and is the second son of polo legend Gonzalo Pieres and Cecilia Rodríguez Piola. His siblings are Gonzalo Pieres, Nicolas Pieres also a professional polo players, Tatiana Pieres, and Cecilia Pieres.

His career started in 1997, when he won the Copa Potrillos with the Ellerstina Jr. team, which was a subsidiary team for the Ellerstina Club founded by his father and Australian media tycoon, Kerry Packer. Since then, he played in Argentina, United Kingdom and the United States. He has won the Hurlingham Open, Tortugas Open and Jockey Club Open (all in Argentina among other tournaments. In 2008, he won the Queen’s Cup (England), though he didn’t take part in the final match, because of an injury, And in 2013 on the team of Zacara played with Lydon Lea, Hilario Ulloa, and Matias Gonzalez.

Facundo has won the most important tournaments of the 'World Polo Tour', the Spanish Grand Slam, Gold Cup, Sotogrande 2018 (American Team 'La Indiana') and 2017 (Spanish Team 'Ayala'), Torneo International de Polo Sotogrande.

He started playing in the Campeonato Argentino Abierto de Polo (Argentine Open) in 2003 and made it into the finals twice (2005 and 2007) with Ellerstina. After losing these in extra-time only, and winning the Tortugas Open 2008. The new team of Ellerstina to 2014 is comformed by: Facundo Pieres 10, Gonzalo Pieres (h) 10, Mariano Aguerre 9 and Nicolas Pieres 9
He was promoted to handicap 10 at age 18.

In June, 2019, Pieres broke royal protocol as he was presented the winner’s trophy at the Cartier Polo Cup in Windsor Great Park, Berkshire. Pieres placed a hand on the top of the Queen’s back and again on her shoulder as Her Majesty presented him with the 'most valuable player' award.

References

External links
Profile on World Polo Tour
Tournaments
Un gran Crack …
Ellerstina Polo team

Argentine polo players
Sportspeople from Buenos Aires Province
1986 births
Living people